Charaxes acuminatus, the pointed pearl charaxes or mountain pearl charaxes, is a butterfly in the family Nymphalidae. It is found in Uganda, Rwanda, Burundi, Kenya, Tanzania, the Democratic Republic of the Congo, Malawi, Zambia and Zimbabwe.

Description
Characterized, as the specific name implies, by the acuminate forewings  Forewing with the distal margin deeply excised and long, sharp, falcate apex. The orange or red-brown spots in the black marginal area small or indistinct. German East Africa.

Biology
The habitat consists of afromontane forests usually at altitudes above 1,800 meters.

Notes on the biology of acuminatus are given by Larsen, T.B. (1991) and  Kielland, J. (1990).
 

The larvae feed on Allophylus species (including A. alnifolius, A. chirindensis, A. abyssinicus, A. chaunostachys and A. africanus) and Bersama abyssinica.

Taxonomy
Charaxes varanes group. Subgenus Stonehamia (Hadrodontes)
The group members are: 
Charaxes varanes
Charaxes fulvescens very similar to varanes
Charaxes acuminatus very pointed forewing
Charaxes balfouri
Charaxes analava
Charaxes nicati
Charaxes bertrami perhaps subspecies of varanes
Charaxes saperanus
Charaxes defulvata

Subspecies
C. a. acuminatus (Tanzania, northern Malawi)
C. a. cottrelli van Someren, 1963 (north-western Zambia, Democratic Republic of Congo: from the south-east to Shaba)
C. a. kigezia van Someren, 1963 (western Uganda, Rwanda, Burundi, Democratic Republic of Congo, north-western Tanzania)
C. a. kulalae van Someren, 1975 (northern Kenya)
C. a. mlanji van Someren, 1963 (southern Malawi)
C. a. nyika van Someren, 1963 (Malawi: Nyika Plateau, north-eastern Zambia)
C. a. oreas Talbot, 1932 (Kenya: central highlands east of the Rift Valley)
C. a. rondonis Kielland, 1987 (south-eastern Tanzania)
C. a. shimbanus van Someren, 1963 (south-eastern coast of Kenya)
C. a. stonehamiana Collins & Larsen, 1991  (western Kenya)
C. a. teitensis van Someren, 1963 (south-eastern Kenya, Tanzania: north to Mount Kilimanjaro and Mount Meru)
C. a. thiryi Bouyer & Vingerhoedt, 2001 (Democratic Republic of Congo)
C. a. usambarensis van Someren, 1963 (north-eastern Tanzania)
C. a. vumba van Someren, 1963 (eastern Zimbabwe)

See also
Albertine Rift

References

Victor Gurney Logan Van Someren (1963). Revisional notes on African Charaxes (Lepidoptera: Nymphalidae). Part I. Bulletin of the British Museum (Natural History) (Entomology) 195-242.

External links
Images of C. acuminatus acuminatus Royal Museum for Central Africa (Albertine Rift Project)
Images of C. acuminatus kigezia Royal Museum for Central Africa (Albertine Rift Project)
Images of C. acuminatus usambarensis  Royal Museum for Central Africa (Albertine Rift Project)
Charaxes acuminatus images at Charaxes page Consortium for the Barcode of Life subspecies and forms
African Butterfly Database Range map via search

Butterflies described in 1903
acuminatus
Butterflies of Africa